Eto'o is a Cameroonian surname that may refer to:

Samuel Eto'o, a former professional footballer
David Eto'o, younger brother of Samuel, a footballer who played for CF Reus Deportiu
Etienne Eto'o, youngest brother of Samuel and David, a footballer who plays for FC Lustenau